Jesús Tablado Feito (born 26 September 1979 in Mieres, Asturias), known as Capi, is a Spanish retired footballer who played as a forward.

External links

1979 births
Living people
Spanish footballers
Footballers from Mieres, Asturias
Association football forwards
Segunda División players
Segunda División B players
Tercera División players
Real Oviedo Vetusta players
Caudal Deportivo footballers
Pontevedra CF footballers
CF Palencia footballers
Alicante CF footballers
Zamora CF footballers